Jalan Malioboro is a major shopping street in Yogyakarta, Indonesia; the name is also used more generally for the neighborhood around the street. It lies north–south axis in the line between Yogyakarta Kraton and Mount Merapi. This is in itself is significant to many of the local population, the north–south orientation between the palace and the volcano being of importance.

The street is the centre of Yogyakarta's largest tourist district surrounded with many hotels, restaurants, and shops nearby. Sidewalks on both sides of the street are crowded with small stalls selling a variety of goods. In the evening several open-air street side restaurants, called lesehan, operate along the street. This is the street of the artists. Street musicians, painters, and other artists exhibit their creations on this road. Less obvious to the tourist, but more for the local population, side streets, lanes and structures that lead on to Malioboro are as important as the street itself.

History

The street was for many years two-way, but by the 1980s had become one way only, from the railway line (where it starts) to the south - to Beringharjo market, where it ends. The largest, oldest Dutch era hotel, Hotel Garuda (currently Grand Inna Malioboro), is located on the street's northern end, on the eastern side adjacent to the railway line. It has the former Dutch era Prime Minister's complex, the kepatihan, on the eastern side.

For many years in the 1980s and later, a cigarette advertisement was placed on the first building south of the railway line - or effectively the last building on Malioboro, which advertised Marlboro cigarettes, no doubt appealing to locals and foreigners who would see a pun with name of the street with a foreign product being advertised.

It does not reach the walls or grounds of the Yogyakarta palace, as Malioboro ceases in name adjacent to the very large market Beringharjo (on the eastern side as well).  From this point the street changes name to Jalan Ahmad Yani (Ahmad Yani Street, currently Margo Mulyo Street) and has the former Governors residence on the western side, and the old Dutch Fort Vredeburg on the eastern side.

Malioboro Night Festival
The festival held annually along Jalan Malioboro until the Monument of General Offensive of First March. Live music, featured music concert, traditional art show, Jembe Percussion, Kumlaka Ethnic, fashion show and other activities are arranged for Malioboro Night Festival.

Public transport
There are three bus stops along the street (Malioboro 1, Malioboro 2, Malioboro 3), serving various routes of Trans Jogja bus. The northern end of the street is close to Yogyakarta station, serving KAI Commuter's Yogyakarta Line and Prambanan Express commuter trains, as well as intercity trains.

References

 Suyenga, Joan A stroll down Yogyakarta's 'Main Street', pp.165-167 of Oey, Eric (1994) Java'' 2nd edition Periplus Editions

External links

  The dagadu shop (on Malioboro) has its version of the history at its website.

Shopping districts and streets in Indonesia
Streets in Indonesia
Transport in the Special Region of Yogyakarta
Tourist attractions in Yogyakarta
Malioboro